The Bruce Lee statue in Hong Kong is a bronze memorial statue of the martial artist Bruce Lee, who died on July 20 1973 at the age of 32, created by sculptor Cao Chong-en, and located on the Avenue of Stars attraction near the waterfront at Tsim Sha Tsui.

History
The Hong Kong Bruce Lee Club raised US$100,000 for a statue to be erected after pleas to the government to honour his legacy. A  bronze statue by artist Cao Chong-en was erected along the Avenue of Stars attraction near the waterfront at Tsim Sha Tsui. It shows a classic 'ready to strike' Bruce Lee pose, as seen in the 1972 movie Fist of Fury. Hew Kuan-yau, a member of the Bruce Lee Fan Club Committee, said, "We want the people to know about the legend of Bruce Lee." The statue was unveiled by Bruce Lee's brother Robert Lee on 27 November 2005, celebrating what would have been Bruce's 65th birthday. 

The statue was featured on the tenth leg of the American reality TV show The Amazing Race 17, the tenth leg of The Amazing Race Norge 1, and the third leg of The Amazing Race Canada 2.

See also 
Statue of Bruce Lee (Los Angeles)
Statue of Bruce Lee (Mostar)

References

External links
 

2005 establishments in Hong Kong
2005 sculptures
Bronze sculptures in Hong Kong
Martial arts culture
Memorials to Bruce Lee
Monuments and memorials in Hong Kong
Outdoor sculptures in Hong Kong
Portraits of actors
Sculptures of men in Hong Kong
Sculptures of sports
Statues in Hong Kong
Tsim Sha Tsui